The Left Bloc (LB; ; Levyy blok, LB) is a social movement uniting activists of the Russian left organizations. It was created at the end of November 2015 from a split in the Left Front. It is strongly critical of President Vladimir Putin.

Purposes and tasks of the Left Bloc
The main goal in the Charter of the Left Bloc declares achievement of a classless society where freedom of development of everyone is the key to free development of all; general public self-government will replace the institute of the government, and work will purchase free character. The task of the Left Bloc proclaims coordination of activity of opposition left forces. The Left Bloc unites several left organizations now, at the same time membership in the Left Bloc does not oblige its participants to leave their own organization.

Symbols

Symbols of the Left Bloc are a flag — a red panel with the black five-pointed star located in the center and a black panel with the red five-pointed star located in the center. The latter being identical to the Zapatista flag.

Actions of the Left Bloc
The Left Bloc holds the various authorized and unsanctioned meetings, pickets, processions. In particular, the Left Bloc together with allies carries out the "Anticapitalizm" actions designed to show, according to organizers, to society availability of political forces of anti-capitalist orientation. The Left Bloc also carries out "School of the Activist" — educational seminars, book, and film societies.

On June 12, 2017, during the protest action in Moscow, activists of the Bloc several times developed in crowd, and then hung out on Tverskaya Street an extension with the inscription "Against corruption only revolution" and symbols of anarchism and communism. During the share two activists of the Left Bloc were detained. Other group of activists remained on the Sakharov Avenue and organized protesters there.

On July 19, 2017, activists of the Left Bloc blocked office of Roskomnadzor in Moscow in protest at censorship on the Internet. Having closed doors bicycle locks, activists scattered leaflets and hung up on the plate of RKN "cap", like that which is seen by visitors of the blocked websites. After the share at Roskomnadzor one of coordinators of the Left Bloc announced breaking of the account in VKontakte social network.

The Left Bloc declared boycott to the election of the president of the Russian Federation on March 18, 2018. On March 11, 2018 activists of the movement hung out a banner with an inscription 2018 March - focuses and clowns" on circus of Nikulin in Moscow. On March 14 to the headquarters of the Left Bloc and home to the activist Vladimir Zhuravlyov police officers came to search. The movement connected it with a campaign for ballot strike

Structure
The Left Bloc is an interregional coalition of the left forces where both individual, and collective participants, by the principle of federation can enter.

Any group of the left activists both on federal, and at the local level on condition of adoption of the organizational principles can become the collective participant of the Left Bloc.

All regional cells are equal and function on the basis of coordination of own actions taking into account regional specifics.

Tactical decisions are made by cells on places taking into account local specifics.

Strategic decisions, acceptance of changes in the organizational principles and statements on behalf of all organization it is performed by Interregional Council of the Left Bloc.

References

External links
Official page on Facebook
 Official channel on Telegram
Official account on Twitter
Official account on Instagram
Official account on Youtube
On 1917 Centenary, Russia's Young Reds Can Only Brood
'We Defeated Hitler, We’ll Defeat Putin'_ 23 Activists Arrested at Moscow Victory Day Parade - Moscow Times
Left in a Corner - Jacobin

2015 establishments in Russia
Civil disobedience
Far-left political parties
Far-left politics in Russia
Opposition to Vladimir Putin
Organizations established in 2015
Political organizations based in Russia
Progressive International
Socialist organizations in Russia
Russia